There are over 9,000 Grade I listed buildings in England. Greater London is divided into 32 boroughs and the City of London and contains 589 of these structures. The buildings have been split into separate lists for each district. There are no Grade I listed buildings in the London Borough of Waltham Forest.

See also
 Grade II* listed buildings in London
 Grade II listed buildings in London
 Listed buildings in England

References
English Heritage Images of England

 
 
London, Greater